Phan Chali is a sub-district in the Wang Thong District of Phitsanulok Province, Thailand.

Geography
Phan Chali lies in the Nan Basin, which is part of the Chao Phraya Watershed.

Administration
The sub-district is divided into 17 smaller divisions called (muban), which roughly correspond to the villages. There are 15 villages, several of which occupy more than one muban. Phan Chali is administered by a tambon administrative organization (TAO). The muban in Phan Chali are enumerated as follows:

Temples
The following is a list of Buddhist temples in the Phan Chali Sub-district:
วัดวังกระชอน in muban 1
วัดพันชาลี in muban 2
วัดหนองทอง in muban 6
วัดเนินไม้แดง in muban 4
วัดหนองกัญญา in muban 7
วัดสุพรรณพนมทอง in muban 8
วัดเขาพนมทองคีรีเขต in muban 9
วัดสุวรรณดำรงธรรม in muban 9
วัดคลองคู่ in muban 9
วัดหนองกาดำบำรุงธรรม in muban 5
วัดวังไม้ตอก in muban 10

References

Tambon of Phitsanulok province
Populated places in Phitsanulok province